The Mayor is the highest elected official in Shawinigan, Quebec, Canada.  Since its incorporation in 1901, the city has had twenty mayors.

Officially, elections to the Shawinigan Council are on a non-partisan basis. In recent history however, mayors of Shawinigan have been generally Liberal leaning. Gérard Dufresne, Dominique Grenier, Roland Désaulniers and Lise Landry were or have been card-carrying supporters of the Quebec Liberal Party and the Liberal Party of Canada.

Footnotes

 
Shawinigan